Stu Megan (Stewart A. Megan, born 1952 in Bristol, England) is now retired, having been a computer software professional since 1968, a career spanning 46 years. He began this career working on early core memory computers such as the LEO Computers LEO III (a room-sized machine that used only switches for control and ferrite rods for memory) to working at Netscape as the System Test Engineering Manager for more recent internet technology products such as Netscape's Directory Server (NDS).

Stu emigrated to Canada in 1981, working for a company called GEAC as a system programmer/developer. GEAC built their own hardware and software systems, compilers and were a leading Canadian corporation. Stu then emigrated to the US with GEAC and worked on many system developer projects there. After working at First Interstate IT Services, he moved to Silicon Valley working at many companies including Syntelligence - an Stanford AI company, both in the US and back in UK, he worked for Netscape as Senior QA Manager on Directory Server ( the birth of the internet ) and more. He subsequently began his own QA TestLab Services Consulting Service, initially providing hands on testing and later becoming a QA infrastructure service for small businesses who needed to start their own internal QA. This involved building the environment and then acquiring the resources needed ( people, software, hardware).

Stu (Stewart)  also worked in the computer game industry for several years, including Sierra's INN network and later Microprose/Spectrum Holobyte where he is credited with working on several games.

In his spare time, he has been involved in volunteering on social projects. One of these was the Spacewatch project in Arizona. His time there involved searching for Near Earth Asteroids. Stu also created and ran a supplemental support site, fmogroup.org  for the volunteers on the project. By analyzing online images, he discovered among others, the close-approaching asteroids 2004 BV18 on January 19, 2004 and 2004 UH1 on October 23, 2004. He analysed over 10,000 online images during his time on the project and discovered 5 asteroids of note.

In July 2004, the asteroid designated 15462 Stumegan was named 'stumegan' in honor of Stewart A Megan's  at the Spacewatch FMO project. The citation states Stewart A. Megan (b. 1952) discovered the Near Earth Object 2004 BV18 in conjunction with the Spacewatch Fast-Moving-Object Project. This find, made using real-time images transferred to volunteers over the Internet, was the subject of much press coverage encouraged others to join the online search. In February 2014, Stu Megan retired after 46 years in the industry, due to health and family issues, which made it impossible for him to continue his business. He is currently working on two novels in his new career as a writer.

Sources
  Minor Planet Center Citation
 
 Spacewatch FMO Project
 CNN Story
 Chron Tech News
 Meteorite Newsgroup
 LA Times
  Universe Today
 CBS News
 USA Today News
  AstroBiology News
 New York Times

1952 births
Living people
Computer programmers